Sexual Chocolate may refer to: 
 Sexual Chocolate, a fictional band in Coming to America
 Mark Henry, wrestler and weightlifter
"Sexual Chocolate", a song on WWF The Music, Vol. 4
 Ryan Sidebottom, cricketer
 "Sexual Chocolate", a song by CeeLo Green from Violator: The Album, V2.0
 Sexual Chocolate, Alanis Morissette's tour band, two members of which became Taylor Hawkins and the Coattail Riders
 Sexual Chocolate, a team that competed in VH1's 2006 World Series of Pop Culture